The Great Night is a 1922 American comedy film directed by Howard M. Mitchell and written by Joseph F. Poland. The film stars William Russell, Eva Novak, Winifred Bryson, Henry A. Barrows, Wade Boteler, and Harry Lonsdale. The film was released on December 3, 1922, by Fox Film Corporation.

Plot

Cast           
William Russell as Larry Gilmore
Eva Novak as Mollie Martin
Winifred Bryson as Papita Gonzales
Henry A. Barrows as Robert Gilmore 
Wade Boteler as Jack Denton
Harry Lonsdale as Simpkins
Earl Metcalfe as Green

References

External links

1922 films
1920s English-language films
Silent American comedy films
1922 comedy films
Fox Film films
Films directed by Howard M. Mitchell
American silent feature films
American black-and-white films
Films with screenplays by Joseph F. Poland
1920s American films